Delan is a locality in the Bundaberg Region, Queensland, Australia.

History 
The locality takes its name from the railway station name assigned by the Queensland Railways Department on 6 January 1921 and is an Aboriginal word meaning possum.

References 

Bundaberg Region
Localities in Queensland